Millennium Middle School may refer to:
 Millennium 6-12 Collegiate Academy, formerly Millennium Middle School, in Broward County Public Schools
 Millennium Middle School, Sanford, Florida, Seminole County Public Schools